Kahama may refer to:

Kahama, Angola, a commune in Cunene Province
Kahama Rural District, one of the districts of Shinyanga Region, Tanzania
Kahama Urban District, one of the districts of Shinyanga Region, Tanzania
Kahama, Tanzania, a town in the district
Kahama Airstrip
Kahama United, a football team in the district
Janet Bina Kahama, a Tanzanian politician
Roman Catholic Diocese of Kahama, a diocese of the Catholic Church in Tanzania
Kahama Chimpanzee Community, one of two communities of chimpanzees in Gombe Stream National Park, Tanzania which engaged in violent conflict 1974-78